The Z.C.B.J. Opera House is a building in Verdigre, Nebraska, United States, that was built in 1903.  It was listed on the National Register of Historic Places in 1988.  It serves as a meeting hall for the Czech community.

See also
 Zapadni Ceska Bratrska Jednota
 Czech-Slovak Protective Society

References

External links

Baroque Revival architecture in the United States
Music venues completed in 1903
Buildings and structures in Knox County, Nebraska
Clubhouses on the National Register of Historic Places in Nebraska
Czech-American culture in Nebraska
Opera houses in Nebraska
Theatres on the National Register of Historic Places in Nebraska
Western Fraternal Life Association
Theatres completed in 1903
National Register of Historic Places in Knox County, Nebraska
Opera houses on the National Register of Historic Places in Nebraska